The Steel Workers Union of Trinidad and Tobago (S.W.U.T.T.) is a trade union in Trinidad and Tobago. The SWUTT is the recognized majority union in the ArcelorMittal Point Lisas steelworks, Tubecity I.M.S., Centrin Steel Company and National Flour Mills (monthly paid workers).

See also

 List of trade unions

Trade unions in Trinidad and Tobago
Steel industry trade unions